The St. Johns Herald was a weekly newspaper published in St. Johns, Arizona beginning on January 15, 1885, with Henry Reed its first editor.  The paper would go through several incarnations as it merged with other publications during its history. There were numerous editors over the decades.  In 1900, Reamer Ling was its editor, and in 1903 Eli S. Perkins was editing the paper.  In 1903 the newspaper merged with Snips, another paper in St. Johns, and ran under the masthead, Snips and St. Johns Herald, and Perkins continued as the editor.  The paper merged again in 1905, this time with the Apache News, changing its masthead once more, to St. Johns Herald and Apache News.  Ling returned to editing duties at the same time, alternating with O. E. Overson through 1910, when George E. Waite became the editor and publisher.  The Waite family published the paper through 1938, and on March 29, 1917, they changed the name of the paper back to The St. Johns Herald.  On February 12, 1938, The St. Johns Herald merged with the St. Johns Observer, becoming the St. Johns Herald-Observer, with Isaac Barth as its publisher and editor.  After Barth's death in 1946, Myrlan G. Brown purchased the paper and merged it with the Apache County Independent-News, and renamed it the Apache County Independent-News and Herald-Observer.  The following year, the paper absorbed the McNary Pine Knot Post, making it the lone newspaper in Apache county at that time, and remained in publication until January 27, 1956.

References

Newspapers published in Arizona
Publications established in 1885
Weekly newspapers published in the United States
Publications disestablished in 1956
1885 establishments in Arizona Territory
1956 disestablishments in Arizona